Holly Isabella Rankin (born 19 December 1991), who performs as Jack River, is an Australian singer-songwriter, multi-instrumentalist, and producer. Her debut album, Sugar Mountain (22 June 2018), peaked at No. 11 on the ARIA Albums Chart. At the ARIA Music Awards of 2018 she received nominations for Breakthrough Artist, Best Pop Release and Engineer of the Year (the latter shared with Xavier Dunn and John Castle).

Early life
Holly Isabella Rankin was born in 1991, to David and Donna Rankin, and raised in Forster, New South Wales. She started writing a diary from the age of five or six, with Rankin stating, "I just had an attraction to writing and also recording things. I've always been fascinated by people and stories and nature."

Career
Rankin initially performed under her given name, before adopting the performance name, Jack River, upon relocating to Sydney. Her eight-track debut extended play, On Nature Part One, was issued in April 2013 via Waterfront Records and MGM Distribution. James Monger of AllMusic described how her, "laid-back, psych-tinged electropop [had] earned her a loyal local following."

River signed with I Oh You / Universal Music Australia, which issued her single, "Talk Like That", in early 2016. Happy Mags Emerson Noble felt, "[it] has an incredibly tangible, organic feel that seems to come pretty naturally to [River]. There is an air of self-produced originality that draws you into this track but it's still so damn hooky that you're going to be singing that sweet synth riff for days."

Her seven-track EP, Highway Songs No. 2 (October 2016) peaked at number 19 on the ARIA Hitseekers Albums Chart. It was co-produced by Rankin and Xavier Dunn. Laura Polson of The Newcastle Herald observed, "On top of writing the melody and lyrics, Rankin seeks landscape sounds to add to her music... the opening track 'Highway (Intro)' draws together carnival sounds with a western, cowboy twist."

River's single, "Fool's Gold" (June 2017), was accompanied by a music video, which Sosefina Fuamoli of The AU Review felt was, "dreamy as hell" and "lit up through a beautifully-crafted haze of a narrative, following different couples." In June–July 2017 the singer-songwriter launched a series of concerts, Electric Lady, featuring only female acts: Ali Barter, Alex Lahey, and Gretta Ray. River supported Midnight Oil during that year and undertook her own Fool's Gold Tour.

On 22 June 2018, River released her debut album, Sugar Mountain, titled for Neil Young's song of the same name. The album recounts River's painful memories, including her sister's fatal accident. During an interview with Richard Kingsmill on 2018, a program on Triple J radio, River explained that music was her way of dealing with emotions and also as therapy, calling it her "go to for everything". It peaked at number 11 on the Albums Chart and received three nominations at the 2018 ARIA Awards: Breakthrough Artist, Best Pop Release and Engineer of the Year (the latter shared with Dunn and John Castle). In October 2019, she came at no.11 in Happy Mag's list of "The 15 Australian female artists changing the game right now".

On 4 October 2019, River released the single "Later Flight" and announced she had an EP due for release on 14 February 2020.

In September 2021, River released "We Are the Youth" saying "At the same time as there is widespread climate injustice, there is ongoing abuse of power on many fronts in our society: against First Nations people, in the halls of parliament and in workplaces everywhere. People are tired of it. We want change and action and we are ready to work to build our way out of a broken system."

In February 2023, River released "Endless Summer", the title track from her forthcoming second studio album, due for release on 16 June 2023.

Personal life
Rankin's sister, Shannon Rankin (born 1995), died in 2006 in an accident due to a faulty drain in a spa.

Political views and activism
On 15 February 2019, Rankin was present at Labor New South Wales' live music policy launch in Sydney  and delivered a speech in opposition to the Baird Government and their lockout laws. In her speech, Rankin endorsed Labor for the 2019 election. On 3 December 2020, Rankin held a climate panel entitled New Energy, designed to get politicians together to discuss energy and climate policy. The event saw politicians respond to questions from guests, including Triple J presenters Avani Dias and Lewis Hobba, in addition to rugby union player David Pocock, motivational speaker Turia Pitt, and Reuben Styles of electronic music duo Peking Duk. On 27 October 2021, Rankin criticised Scott Morrison and his Government's plan to reach net-zero emissions by 2050, labelling it "gutless" and "paper thin".

Discography

Studio albums

Extended plays

Singles

As lead artist

As featured artist

Awards

AIR Awards
The Australian Independent Record Awards (commonly known informally as AIR Awards) is an annual awards night to recognise, promote and celebrate the success of Australia's Independent Music sector.

! 
|-
! scope="row"| 2020
| Sugar Mountain
| Best Independent Pop Album or EP
| 
|
|-
! scope="row"| 2021
| Stranger Heart
| Best Independent Pop Album or EP
| 
|

APRA Music Awards
The APRA Music Awards are an annual awards ceremony. Jack River has received two nominations.

! 
|-
! scope="row"| 2019  
| Herself
| Breakthrough Songwriter of the Year 
| 
| 
|-
! scope="row"| 2020  
| "Sugar" 
| Most Performed Dance Work of the Year 
| 
| 
|}

ARIA Music Awards
The ARIA Music Awards is an annual awards ceremony that recognises excellence, innovation, and achievement across all genres of Australian music. Jack River has received 4 nominations overall.

|-
|rowspan="3"| 2018  
|rowspan="2"| Sugar Mountain 
| Breakthrough Artist 
| 
|-
| Best Pop Release 
| 
|-
| Holly Rankin, Xavier Dunn & John Castle for Sugar Mountain 
| Engineer of the Year 
| 
|-
| 2019  
| "Sugar" 
| Best Dance Release 
| 
|}

Environmental Music Prize
The Environmental Music Prize is a quest to find a theme song to inspire action on climate and conservation. It commenced in 2022.

! 
|-
| 2022
| "We Are the Youth"
| Environmental Music Prize
| 
| 
|-

J Awards
The J Awards are an annual series of Australian music awards that were established by the Australian Broadcasting Corporation's youth-focused radio station Triple J. They commenced in 2005.

! 
|-
| J Awards of 2017
| "Fool's Gold"
| Australian Video of the Year
| 
| 
|-
| J Awards of 2021
| Jack River
| You Done Good Award
| 
|

National Live Music Awards
The National Live Music Awards (NLMAs) are a broad recognition of Australia's diverse live industry, celebrating the success of the Australian live scene. The awards commenced in 2016.

! 
|-
! scope="row" rowspan="2"| 2019
| rowspan="2"| Herself
| Live Pop Act of the Year
| 
|| 
|-
| NSW Live Act of the Year
| 
|| 
|}

Rolling Stone Australia Awards
The Rolling Stone Australia Awards are awarded annually in January or February by the Australian edition of Rolling Stone magazine for outstanding contributions to popular culture in the previous year.

! 
|-
| 2022
| "We Are the Youth"
| Best Single
| 
| 
|-

References

1991 births
Living people
Australian musicians
Australian women pop singers
21st-century Australian singers
21st-century Australian women singers
Nettwerk Music Group artists
Universal Music Group artists